Jerry Walter Kilgore (born August 23, 1961) is an American attorney, politician and member of the Republican Party. He served as the Attorney General of Virginia from 2002 to 2005 and was the Republican nominee for Governor of Virginia in 2005, losing to Democratic nominee Tim Kaine. He is a partner with the law firm Cozen O'Connor and is a member of the firm's leading State Attorneys General practice in Washington, D.C. He also serves as finance chairman of the Republican Party of Virginia.

He was previously a partner at McGuireWoods and a senior advisor with McGuireWoods Consulting in Richmond, Virginia.

Background
Born in Kingsport, Tennessee on August 23, 1961, Kilgore earned a B.A. degree summa cum laude from Clinch Valley College (now the University of Virginia's College at Wise) in 1983 and a J.D. from the William & Mary School of Law in 1986. His twin brother, Terry Kilgore, has served in the Virginia House of Delegates since 1994.

Early career
During 1987 and 1992, Kilgore served as an Assistant United States Attorney for the Western District of Virginia. He was Secretary of Public Safety under Governor George Allen from 1994 to 1998 and was elected Attorney General of Virginia in the 2001 Virginia Attorney General election by a wide margin.

Kilgore is known for his conservative views on social issues, especially with respect to gun control, religion and abortion. He was critical of Democratic Governor Mark Warner's fiscal policy, particularly the 2004 budget that included substantial tax increases. Kilgore garnered national attention for his opposition to the Herndon day-laborer center and he has traditionally held the view that laws regarding illegal immigration should be enforced stringently.

2005 gubernatorial campaign

Kilgore resigned as Attorney General in February 2005 to run for Governor (as is the convention in Virginia) and easily won the primary election against Warrenton Mayor George B. Fitch to become the Republican nominee. In the general election, he ran against Democratic nominee Tim Kaine, the Lieutenant Governor of Virginia, and State Senator Russ Potts, a pro-choice Republican who ran as an independent candidate. Early in the race, Kilgore showed solid leads of ten points or more in the polls, but Kaine steadily closed the gap and ultimately defeated Kilgore by a margin of 52% to 46%.

Kilgore's campaign was at times criticized for taking steps to avoid debates; Kilgore refused to debate Potts for the majority of the campaign, at times leaving Kaine and Potts to debate each other in his absence. He agreed to debate only with Kaine, and only if the footage could not be aired in campaign commercials. During this debate, he refused to answer whether or not he would make abortion a crime. This apparent public moderation of his previously open and hard-line stance on abortion troubled some of his conservative supporters.

He was further criticized for failing to limit his negative advertisements to 50% of his campaign's total publicity as Kaine proposed. One such advertisement featured a father whose son had been murdered by a man who was on Virginia's death row; the father expressed doubt that the sentence would be carried out if Kaine were elected and alleged that Kaine would not even have authorized the execution of Adolf Hitler, based on an interview with the Richmond Times-Dispatch. The negative reaction to the mention of Hitler combined with Kaine's pledge to carry out the death penalty and explanation of his personal opposition as arising from his Catholic faith helped to neutralize what many observers thought would've been a potent issue for Kilgore.

In trying to explain how a solid Republican could lose a traditionally Republican state by such a large margin, political commentators cited numerous key factors. Kaine's campaign had many political advantages, including his association with the state's popular Democratic Governor Mark Warner and defense of Warner's 2004 budget priorities, his "response ads" to Kilgore's death penalty advertisements, which featured him speaking to voters about his religious convictions, his relentless in-person campaigning across the state, and his opposition to tax increases. In contrast, Kilgore's campaign had many political disadvantages, including a backlash over the death penalty ads that Kilgore's campaign ran in the fall, the relatively low poll numbers of then-President George W. Bush at the time the election, and a bitter division between the moderate and conservative wings of the Republican party over tax and spending priorities.

Electoral history

References 

 They'll kill for this job – Staunton News-Leader — October 19, 2005
 Death penalty attack is a vile political tactic – Bristol Herald Courier — October 14, 2005
 Death penalty demagoguery – The Roanoke Times — October 13, 2005
 Jerry Kilgore's shrinking low profile – The Roanoke Times — October 6, 2005
 Ad Watch: Kilgore's gas tax claim in new ad is unfounded – The Virginian-Pilot — September 30, 2005
 Schapiro, Jeff E. Kilgore refuses to debate Potts – Richmond Times-Dispatch — June 16, 2005.
 Branigin, William: Kaine Defeats Kilgore in Va. Gubernatorial Race, Washington Post, Nov. 8, 2005.

|-

1961 births
Living people
People from Kingsport, Tennessee
Virginia Republicans
William & Mary Law School alumni
Virginia Attorneys General
Virginia lawyers
Politicians from Richmond, Virginia
State cabinet secretaries of Virginia
American twins
Identical twins
Candidates in the 2005 United States elections
20th-century American lawyers
Assistant United States Attorneys
20th-century American politicians
21st-century American politicians